Alexander Gordon Hearne (born 23 September 1993) is an English former first-class cricketer.

Hearne was born at Kensington in September 1993 and was educated at Radley College, before going up to St John's College, Cambridge. While studying at Cambridge, he played four first-class cricket matches for Cambridge University against Oxford University in The University Matches of 2013, 2014, 2015 and 2016. He made an additional two first-class appearances for Cambridge MCCU against county opposition in the form of Essex in 2013 and Surrey in 2014. In six first-class matches, he scored 265 runs, 253 of which came for Cambridge University at an average of 36.14 and with a high score of 88.

Notes and references

External links

1993 births
Living people
Sportspeople from Kensington
People educated at Radley College
Alumni of St John's College, Cambridge
English cricketers
Cambridge University cricketers
Cambridge MCCU cricketers